Pollini may refer to:
 Gino Pollini (1903–1991), an Italian architect, father of Maurizio
 John Pollini, an American professor of Art History and History at the University of Southern California
 Maurizio Pollini (born 1942), an Italian classical pianist
 Renato Pollini (1925-2010), an Italian politician and mayor
 Apollonia (Illyria), an ancient city in Albania